Chatham railway station may refer to

Chatham railway station (Kent), England
Chatham railway station, Melbourne, Australia
Chatham railway station (Ontario), Canada
Chatham station (Massachusetts), United States
Chatham station (NJ Transit), New Jersey, United States
Union Station (Chatham, New York), United States